Coober Pedy Airport  serves the opal mining town of Coober Pedy in outback South Australia. It is located southwest of the township. The airfield, which was renamed Redstone Airport in-game, was featured in the 2016 racing video game Forza Horizon 3 on the Xbox One and is often used for drag races.

Airlines and destinations

See also
 List of airports in South Australia

References

Airports in South Australia
Far North (South Australia)